Van der Geest is a Dutch surname. Notable people with the surname include:

Cornelis van der Geest (1577–1638), Flemish businessman
Dennis van der Geest (born 1975), Dutch judoka
Elco van der Geest (born 1979), Dutch-born Belgian judoka
Jack van der Geest (1923–2009), Dutch concentration camp survivor
Frank van der Geest (born 1973), Dutch association football and beach soccer goalkeeper
Simon van der Geest (born 1978), Dutch writer and poet

Dutch-language surnames